The Australian Professional Leagues, commonly abbreviated to the APL, and sometimes referred to as the A-Leagues, are the governing body for the A-League Men, A-League Women, A-League Youth and E-League. Since their formation, they have been mostly independent of Football Australia, but remain under their umbrella.

History
On 31 December 2020, Football Australia announced the Australian Professional Leagues would be unbundled from the rest of the governing body, taking over the operational, commercial and marketing responsibilities, although Football Australia would still manage disciplinary and integrity matters, club, player and official registration, transfers and match scheduling. Ahead of the 2021–22 season, the APL rebranded various aspects of the professional leagues:

 A-League became A-League Men
 FFA Cup became Australia Cup, due to the FFA no longer controlling the competition.
 W-League became A-League Women
 Y-League became A-League Youth

In addition to the renamings, the logos of the men's, women's and youth leagues were changed to reflect the new identity of the league. The Australia Cup logo was retained, although with the name change being reflected. The change drew some criticism from social media, with fans saying that the new logo was "lazy", whilst some pointed out the resemblance to the logo of South Australian company Adelaide Building Consultants. Others praised the rebranding as it brought the men's and women's competitions under the same brand.

2022 Grand Final decision

On 12 December 2022, the APL announced that the 2023, 2024 and 2025 grand finals would be hosted in Sydney, an announcement that was met with universal backlash from fans of all teams, former players and active support groups. Melbourne Victory and Wellington Phoenix both released a statement after the announcement, saying that "they will always prefer to play any grand final that they earn the right to host, at their home ground". Western United released a statement, saying that they "do not support the grand finals being held in Sydney". Adelaide United winger Craig Goodwin appeared in a video promoting the Grand Final, saying "they're (grand finals) everything you dream of as a kid", however he has stated that he does not support the decision to host the grand final in Sydney.

References

Soccer governing bodies in Australia
2020 establishments in Australia
Sports organizations established in 2020
Organisations based in Sydney